Marvo the Wonder Chicken is a character in the UK comic The Dandy. The strip first appeared in 1990, and continued in odd issues until 1999. He returned in 2008 to tie in with the planned DC Thomson TV series. The strip is "silent", with only words such as "Crash" and "Bang", and ending with Marvo saying "Ta-da".
Marvo's sidekick and biggest fan, Henry Thrapplewhacker XLIX, also appears.

The strip was originally drawn by Syd Kitching, then by Jim Hansen; it took up half a page in the comic, and either one or two pages in the annuals. Jim Hansen was also drawing Jak and P5 for The Dandy, and Buster for his self-titled comic. When the strip returned in Dandy Xtreme 18 years later, it was drawn by Nigel Parkinson, who at the time was also drawing Dennis the Menace, Bea and Ivy the Terrible for The Beano, Dennis and Gnasher for BeanoMAX, and Cuddles and Dimples for the Dandy. It was dropped after Dandy Xtreme reverted to just The Dandy, with Marvo taking his final bow in issue 3507, dated 9 October 2010. He returned in issue 3515, dated 18 December 2010, but has not returned since.

An animated version of the comic strip appeared in 2010, with 51 episodes.

References

British comics characters
Male characters in comics
Fictional chickens
Gag-a-day comics
The Dandy
1990 comics debuts
1999 comics endings
Comics adapted into television series
Comics adapted into animated series
2008 British television series debuts
Dandy strips